Madimba is a town in Kongo Central Province in the Democratic Republic of the Congo lying between the capital and the coast.

Transport 

It is served by a station on the national railway system.

See also 

 Railway stations in DRCongo

References 

Populated places in Kongo Central